Markandeya is a river of southern India.

Current State 
At present, the Markandeya is filled with silt and bushes have grown along the banks. Besides, hundreds of farmers have constructed wells within the riparian bed to irrigate their standing crops during summer. The silt formation has resulted in reduction of water storage capacity. Around two decades ago, the 70-km long river would flow throughout the year, but now it has turned into a rivulet. At Kangrali, the river is around 30 feet wide and just around 8 feet deep. The rejuvenation had already started from Rakasakopp reservoir, from where the River gets excess spill. The 24-km long stretch passing through Belagundi, Bijagarni, Sulaga and Uchagaon to be rejuvenated. Also encroachment is one of the problem for rejuvenation.

Dam
Government of Karnataka is constructing an irrigation dam across Markandeya river at Shirur, near Hukkeri. Catchment area of the Dam will be 432 Sq. km. Gross Storage to be 3.7 TMC. For the construction of this Dam, 898 Hectares of land was to be acquired, out of which 142 Hectares was  Forest area and 756 Hectares was Cultivable land. Total 9 Villages were submerged which lead 2258 people to vacate their land.

Bellary Nala
Bellary Nala is a tributary of Markandeya River, which converges near Karaguppi in Hukkeri Taluk ( from Pachapur Railway Station) in Belgaum district.

See also
Krishna Water Disputes Tribunal
Krishna River
Ghataprabha River
Godchinamalaki Falls

References

 
Rivers of Karnataka
Rivers of India